Stephen McNamara (born 1973) is an Irish former hurler and manager who played as a right corner-forward for the Clare senior team.

McNamara made his first appearance for the team during the 1995 championship and was a regular member of the starting fifteen until his retirement after the 1999 championship. During that time he won two All-Ireland medals and three Munster medals.

At club level McNamara played with Éire Óg.

In retirement from playing McNamara has become involved in coaching, most notably with Faughs and Ballinteer St. John's in Dublin.

McNamara is the third generation of his family to enjoy All-Ireland success. His grandfather Jackie Power won two All-Ireland medals with Limerick in 1936 and 1940, while his uncle, Ger Power, won eight All-Ireland football medals with Kerry between 1975 and 1986.

References

1973 births
Living people
Éire Óg Ennis hurlers
Clare inter-county hurlers
All-Ireland Senior Hurling Championship winners
Hurling managers
People from Ennis